Gossen's laws, named for Hermann Heinrich Gossen (1810–1858), are three laws of economics:
 Gossen's First Law is the "law" of diminishing marginal utility: that marginal utilities are diminishing across the ranges relevant to decision-making.
 Gossen's Second Law, which presumes that utility is at least weakly quantified, is that in equilibrium an agent will allocate expenditures so that the ratio of marginal utility to price (marginal cost of acquisition) is equal across all goods and services.

where
  is utility
  is quantity of the -th good or service
  is the price of the -th good or service
 Gossen's Third Law is that scarcity is a precondition for economic value.

See also 
 Marginalism

References 
 Gossen, Hermann Heinrich; Die Entwicklung der Gesetze des menschlichen Verkehrs und der daraus fließenden Regeln für menschliches Handeln (1854).  Translated into English as The Laws of Human Relations and the Rules of Human Action Derived Therefrom (1983) MIT Press, .

Marginal concepts
Utility